Boris Maximovich Kosarev (1911–1989) was a Soviet photographer, journalist, in 1930 - 1950 he was an official photographer of the Soviet government, who participated at key historical events, including the Yalta Conference of 1945. 
Boris Kosarev is the author of many famous photographs of political events and Soviet leaders.

Biography 

Boris Kosarev was born on 29 October 1911, in a small town of Odoyev, Tula Governorate.

When Boris turned 14, his father gave him a camera as a present. He printed photographic plates, learned to work with photographic chemicals, learned how to print photographs.

1927-1929 he worked as a press operator on "Electrosvet" factory, at the same time he attended photo courses at the Society of Friends of the Soviet cinema.

Boris offered his photographs to popular newspapers and magazines, the first works were published in the newspaper "Vechernyaya Moskva".

In 1929 famous Soviet writer Maxim Gorky invited Boris to work for his magazine "Our achievements", where Boris worked as photojournalist for couple of years.

In 1929-1932 - pictures were published in the Soviet magazines "RABIS", "Cinema and the life."

1932–1933 years – official photographer of Pribalhashstroy Construction, photographer of "Soyuzfoto" Agency.

On his return to Moscow Boris worked for "The Northern Route" and "Komsomolskaya Pravda" newspapers, his pictures were also published in many other Moscow newspapers.

In 1934 Boris joined the Soviet Army and served on the western border of the USSR in the Ukrainian SSR. Demobilized in 1936.

From 1936 to 1960 - the official photographer of Council of Ministers of the Soviet Union.

In February 1945 Boris Kosarev was sent as a photographer to the Crimea, to take official photos of the Yalta Conference, the meeting of Heads of governments of the United States, the Great Britain and the Soviet Union.

Some of the images, e.g.The Big Three" (Stalin, Roosevelt and Churchill) repeatedly published in various international journals. 
Stalin often asked Mr. Kosarev to reflect the Soviet delegation in the most favorable angle.

1956-1958 – Boris finished courses of photojournalists at the Union of Journalists

1960 - Member of the USSR Union of Journalists

1960 – Freelance photojournalist

Boris worked as a photographer almost at all events at the Red Square. Created a gallery of photo portraits and genre scenes of life of the Soviet leaders, such as Khrushchev, Brezhnev, Andropov.

Boris joined political visits of the Soviet leaders to foreign countries, including Malenkov visit to the UK. 
He made photos of the famous personalities - Sholokhov, Solzhenitsyn, Rostropovich, Bondarchuk, Maya Plisetskaya, Rockfeller (how visited the USSR for the US exhibition of 1954).

For many years he worked as a photojournalist in the "Novosti" Press Agency, TASS, and others.
In recent decades Boris's photos published in the journals of Ogoniok, "Soviet Photo", in different newspapers such as Pravda. Boris liked the topic of the state border, many pictures were published in "The Border" magazine.

Until the end of life Boris Kosarev actively worked, photographed and wrote novels and poems.

Boris Kosarev died on 14 November 1989.

Boris's son, Aleksander Kosarev (1944–2013), took over Boris's creative route and became Russian film director, Honored Art Worker of Russia, screenwriter and actor, poet.

Some works

Honors 
 Medal "For the Defence of Moscow" - 1944
 Order of the Red Star - 1945
 Medal "For the Victory over Germany in the Great Patriotic War 1941–1945" - 1945
 Medal "In Commemoration of the 800th Anniversary of Moscow" - 1947
 Jubilee Medal "30 Years of the Soviet Army and Navy" - 1948
 Jubilee Medal "40 Years of the Armed Forces of the USSR" - 1957
 Medal for Battle Merit - 1949
 Order of the Red Star - 1954
 Medal "For Impeccable Service" 1st class - 1958
 Jubilee Medal "Twenty Years of Victory in the Great Patriotic War 1941–1945" - 1965
 Jubilee Medal "50 Years of the Armed Forces of the USSR" - 1967
 Jubilee Medal "In Commemoration of the 100th Anniversary of the Birth of Vladimir Ilyich Lenin"– 1970
 Honored Cultural Worker of the RSFSR

Photo works "Snowing", "Before the Storm" and "The first space flight" were internationally awarded with medals and prizes

Exhibitions 
 Bucharest – Szeged – 1958
 France – Nantes – 5th International saloon of photo art – 1960
 Singapore – 2nd International saloon of photography – 1960
 USA – Chicago – 1960
 Spain – Alicante – 1960
 France – Bordeaux – 1960
 Hong Kong – 1960
 United Kingdom of Great Britain – Leeds – 1960
 Spain – Barcelona – 1960
 Cuba – Havana – 1960
 Hungary – Budapest – 1961
 Australia – Melbourne – 1961
 Norway – Oslo – 1961
 Russia, Moscow – Museum of Moscow, Multimedia Art Museum, Lumiere Brothers Center for Photography – 2015
 Russia, Moscow – Museum of Moscow, Lumiere Brothers Center for Photography – 2016
 Russia, Moscow – Museum of Moscow, Moscow Manege – 2017
 Russia, Moscow – Exhibition dedicated to Russian football and World Cup 2018 – 2018
Solo exhibitions:
 Russia, Moscow – Gallery Lure Ultra Lounge – 2006
 Russia, Moscow – Museum of Moscow – 2016
 Russia, Moscow – Museum of Moscow – 2017

References 
 Elena Barkovskaya. Comrade Kosarev and comrade Churchill // Young kommunar 2011
 A unique exhibition of photographs B. Kosarev. «Light in B & W» ("Light in Black and White")
 Boris Kosarev. Soviet history in the faces of "Russian Reporter" № 38 (68) 9 October 2008
 Boris Maximovich Kosarev in the story "Chuhlinskoe childhood" V. Sergeechev (excerpt)
 Boris Maximovich Kosarev talks about the Yalta Conference in the story "Chuhlinskoe childhood" V.Sergeechev
 Boris Maximovich Kosarev  "The Stalin album" in the story "Chuhlinskoe childhood" V.Sergeechev
 Photos of Boris Kosarev, archives RGALI Moscow
 Photos of Boris Kosarev, Center of Photography Lumiere brothers
 Little-known photos of Boris Kosarev are presented in the Museum of Moscow. TV Channel "Culture" 02.05.2017
 Three exhibitions to go to this summer. The TV Channel "Dozhd" 19.06.2017
 Park of the Soviet period: TASS Opens Photo Archives. TV channel "Dozhd" 02.11.2017
 Main shots: a thousand views of the era at the exhibition in the Moscow Manege. Forbes.ru. 03.11.2017
 Photos of Boris Kosarev at the exhibition "Main shots". Esquire.ru

1911 births
1989 deaths
People from Odoyevsky District
People from Odoyevsky Uyezd
Communist Party of the Soviet Union members
Soviet photographers
Recipients of the Order of the Red Star